Neoprocris is a genus of moths of the family Zygaenidae.

Species
 Neoprocris saltuaria Jordan, 1915
 Neoprocris floridana Tarmann, 1984

References
 Neoprocris at funet.fi

Procridinae
Zygaenidae genera